PENTAX *ist DS is a digital SLR camera produced by Pentax. The *ist DS produces a 6.1 megapixel resolution image.  The *ist DS was a lower-prices follow-on to the Pentax *ist D. In September 2005 the Digital Imaging Websites Association (DIWA), a worldwide organization of collaborating websites,  announced that Pentax had received their first DIWA Award for a DSLR camera. The *ist DS model was awarded with a Silver medal for outstanding test results.

Description
As with other Pentax DSLRs, the *ist DS uses the Pentax KAF bayonet mount and can use older lenses using the KA-mount without limitations. Original K mount lenses and, with adapter also M42 screw-mount lenses, can be used in manual mode by selecting a menu option. Centre-weighted metering, aperture priority and focus indication are maintained, even with adapter mounted lenses. When using non-auto aperture lenses, a press of the AE-L button with the camera in manual mode will meter the scene and set the shutter speed. Some non-Pentax K-mount lenses have been reported not to mount on the camera, because a plate protecting the aperture stop-down lever is slightly deeper.

Along with the other D-series Pentax DSLRs, the Pentax *ist DS, Pentax *ist DS2, and Pentax *ist D have TTL-mode (not only P-TTL) for external flash. This allows the photographer to use cheaper TTL flashes rather than the current offerings from Pentax and Samsung with 'pre-flash' operation, which can cause some subjects to blink. Unlike red-eye reduction pre-flash, the P-TTL pre-flash for metering purposes fires only a brief moment before the main flash. Looking through the viewfinder, it can be seen before the mirror flips up.

Firmware version 2.02 adds SDHC cards support, continuous AF support, and auto ISO mode (selectable from 200–400, 200–800, 200–1600, 200–3200 ISO).

Pentax *ist DS2
Introduced in 2005, the Pentax *ist DS2 is a minor upgrade to the original model that increased the size of the rear LCD from 2.0" to 2.5".

References
Pentax *istDS Camera Manual (PDF)
Pentax *istDS Software Manual (PDF)
  Pentax *ist DS2 announcement

External links

DPReview.com *istDS Specifications
DPReview.com *istDS Review – March 2005
PENTAX Firmware Update Software for *istDS

ist DS
Pentax K-mount cameras